Hem Bahadur Singh (Nepali:हेम बहादुर सिंह) is a retired chief of the Nepal Police. He is the last I.G.P. to wear the "Khaki" uniform. It was during his tenure as police chief that the 1990 People's Movement occurred. 

Hem Bahadur Singh succeeded DB Lama as the Nepal police chief. Ratna Shumsher J.B.R. succeeded him as the next police chief.

Ex-I.G.P. Hem Bahadur Singh was awarded a lifetime achievement award by PM Bhattarai at a function organized by the National Police Academy, Maharajgunj, on the occasion of the 57th Police Day.

References

Living people
Year of birth missing (living people)
Nepalese police officers
Chiefs of police
Inspectors General of Police (Nepal)